Isom is a small unincorporated community in Letcher County, Kentucky, United States. It is located at the junction of KY 7, KY 15 and KY 1148 nine miles (14.4 km) northwest of Whitesburg. As of the 2000 United States Census, the approximate population of the area in the Isom zip code was 1,078.

History
Isom was named for Isom Sergent, a postmaster that lived in the community. It is located between Whitesburg and Hazard. Isom was very well known in the 1950s and early 1960s for the ever-popular Stock Sale. It was the central hub on weekends for buying, trading or selling livestock, produce, and many other goods. Families out for a Sunday drive would usually go by the Stock Sale.

Isom Days
The first weekend of September each year, Isom hosts the Isom Day's Festival. The festival includes food booths, vendors and craft booths. Also various amounts of carnival games and rides.  The festival's biggest attention-getter is its International Pro Rodeo Association-sanctioned rodeo, which will be hosted by Rafter M. Rodeo on the fair grounds Aug. 31-Sept. 1. Shows begin at approximately 7 p.m. each evening. Professional cowboys and cowgirls from across the country compete for titles in seven different categories, including bronco riding, bull riding, calf roping, cowgirl barrel racing, steer racing and other rodeo events. The show also features comedy from the rodeo clown and other special performances. Winners of the Isom rodeo will go on to compete for a national title in January in Oklahoma.

Mountain Speedway
Mountain Speedway is located about a mile off of highway 15. The race track has a 330 foot Asphalt Drag Strip & 3/8 mile Clay Oval.

Mountaineer Kartway
Founder and owner is Timothy Breeding. It is located on Highway 7 North Whitesburg, KY 41858. It's a Kentucky cooperation that has been running for eight years and nine months.

Restaurants
 Joe Packs Famous Chicken bar located at 85 Highway 1148 Isom, Ky 41824 (606) 633-4209.
 Holcomb's Custard in Isom, KY is a private company categorized under Refreshment Stands. It was established in 1997 and incorporated in Kentucky.
 Paradise Pizza located at 9299 Ky-15, Isom, Ky 41824

References

Kentucky Transportation Cabinet. Official State Highway Map, 2006 edition.

Unincorporated communities in Letcher County, Kentucky
Unincorporated communities in Kentucky